Ricky King (born Hans Lingenfelder March 12, 1946 in Rastatt, Baden-Württemberg) is a German guitarist.  His singles "Verde" and "Le rêve" reached the top ten in Germany, Austria, and Switzerland in 1976. and number 65 in Australia in 1977.

References

1946 births
Living people
People from Rastatt
German male musicians